Manfred Günther (born 1948 in Bochum), is a German educational psychologist, specialised in young people, the prevention of violence and social therapy methods; today he works as an author and coach. He lives in Berlin, Germany and Tenerife, Spain. 
 
His daughter Sira, master of sustainability management, is busy working in a famous photovoltaics-startup of Cologne.

Career
At the beginning of his career, he discovered the psychological works of Frederick Kanfer and Heinz Heckhausen in Bochum and of Klaus Holzkamp and Eva Jaeggi in Berlin. He graduated in 1974. Günther is also an Economics-and-Work teacher, school psychologist, as well as being a dovish follower of cognitive behavioural therapy. Later, from 1984-1986 he studied Health Sciences at famed Professor Dieter Kleiber’s institute.

Professional Experience
In 1977, Günther became the director of a private residential treatment centre (therapeutic boarding school). In 1979, he discovered Sam Ferrainola's Camp, namely the Glen Mills Schools close to Philadelphia, discussed this with Howard W. Polsky in New York City. and got internships 1980 in Boston's famous counseling-team Bridge Over Troubled Waters and in the very special Robert White School. While travelling he inspected other psychosocial projects in countries like Denmark, Ukraine (USSR), Canada, Italy (and after 1990 in Hungary). After that, feeling inspired, Manfred founded and took charge of a consultancy for young people called "JOKER" in West Berlin's City in 1982, a position he held for 17 years. Later (2003–2006) he moved to the Bonn-institution "German Crime Prevention Forum (DFK)" to investigate and write surveys on "Prevention of violence for children in schools" after the first extreme german school shooting in Erfurt. From 2007-2013 he has been a consultant and in the emergency psychological service at the Ministry of Education, Youth and Sciences in Berlin (Federal State).

To discuss his ideas, Günther was being interviewed on radio- and TV channels such as SFB 2, SFB 3, Hallo, N 24 and ZDF-Moma. The Ministry of Education, School, Youth and Family Brandenburg commissioned Manfred Günther with the curriculum development Social Work (Youth)

Universities
For 40 years, Günther has worked beside his main occupations in four different universities of Berlin and from 2011-2015 in Magdeburg. His main subjects are "Rights of young people" and "Violence among pupils".

Memberships
 1977-1980: Trade union "OTV Berlin, in charge of the "churches" group
 1993-1998: Member of the "Landesjugendhilfeausschuss" in Berlin
 1992-2000: On the supervisory board of the "Pestalozzi-Fröbel-Haus"
 1993-1997: Management team for "Humanistischer Verband Deutschlands, Berlin"
 1996-1998: Management team responsible for "Aktion 70"
Today: 
 "German Humanist Association / IHEU", member of arbitration committee
 "White Ring/WEISSER RING"

Bibliography

Selection from roughly 40 essays
 Disziplinierte Schüler durch Verhaltensmodifikation?, in: Klaus Ulich (Hrsg.): Wenn Schüler stören. Beltz, München 1980, ; Preview in: Demokratische Erziehung (3. Jg. Heft 1) 1977; once more in: Moll-Strobel, H. (Hrsg.) : „Die Problematik der Disziplinschwierigkeiten im Unterricht". Darmstadt 1982 
 Alternative Konzepte für 'nichtbeschulbare' und delinquente Jugendliche in den USA, in: Sozialpädagogik (23) 1981. ISSN 0038-6189
 Psychosoziale Auswirkungen von Arbeitslosigkeit auf Jugendliche, in: Jugend – Beruf – Gesellschaft 4/1981; once more in: BAG Jugendaufbauwerk (Hrsg.): Jugendarbeitslosigkeit - Angebote der Jugendsozialarbeit zur Lösung eines drängenden Problems, Bonn 1982
 Hilfen für junge Volljährige nach SGB VIII § 41, in: Jugendhilfe 8/ 1993
 Prävention durch Sport, in: Forum Kriminalprävention. 2/ 2006

Research
 (with Kurt Kersten): Jugend in Wilmersdorf 1984. Eine empirische Studie zum Zeitbewußtsein, Freizeit- und Problemverhalten der Jugendlichen im Bezirk, Community of Berlin-Wilmersdorf 1985
 Psychodiagnostik, ambulante Therapie und Unterbringung in heilpädagogischen oder klinischen Einrichtungen. Eine Untersuchung über Indikationsprobleme bei Jugendlichen mit psychischen Störungen in psychosozialen Diensten, Berlin 1986
 (with Sebastian Braunert): Zur Situation der Erziehungs- und Familienberatungsstellen in Deutschland. Rahmenbedingungen, Prävention, Kooperation, Bonn 2005

Books (Selection)
 Child and Youth Welfare Law in Germany. An overview for educators, psychologists, paediatricians and politicians, Springer Nature Wiesbaden 2022. ISBN 978-3-658-38289-6; E-book 978-3-658-3829-2
 Gewalt an Schulen – Prävention. Erprobte Programme, Positionen und Praxis-Projekte, Springer Group, Wiesbaden  2. Auflage 2021,  			ISBN 978-3-658-32578-7; E-Book 978-3-658-32579-4
 Kindheit - Jugend - Alter, HG Butzko prefacing, Rheine 2020 
 Alles was jungen Menchen Recht ist. Sigrun von Hasseln-Grindel prefacing; Berlin 2019 
 Pädagogisches Rollenspiel, Springer Essentials Wiesbaden 2018, 2019. ; e-Book 978-3-658-22793-7  
 Hilfe! Jugendhilfe, Jörg M. Fegert prefacing; 528 p., Rheine 2018 
 Jugendliche im Berliner Psychodschungel, Berlin 1987,

References

External links

 Official Webside
 specialists in psychosocial and family rights mediation, Berlin
 
 

1948 births
German psychologists
Educational psychologists
People from Berlin
German humanists
Living people